KPHL (90.5 FM) is a non-commercial educational radio station licensed to serve Pahala, Hawaii.  The station is owned by Vineyard Christian Fellowship of Honolulu, Inc.  It airs a religious broadcasting format.

The station was assigned the KPHL call letters by the Federal Communications Commission on February 13, 2003.

Ownership
In November 2006, an agreement was reached for Vineyard Christian Fellowship of Honolulu Inc., headed by president Fali Tualaulelei, to acquire KPHL from Memphis, Tennessee-based Broadcasting For The Challenged Inc., headed by President George Flinn Jr., for a reported cash sale price of $1,500. T.J. Malievsky, a director of the Vineyard Christian Fellowship, is a former general manager of the Honolulu station group owned by Salem Communications.

References

External links

PHL